Acacia legnota, also known as heath wattle, is a shrub of the genus Acacia and the subgenus Plurinerves that is endemic to an area of north eastern Australia.

Description
Like most species of Acacia it has phyllodes rather than true leaves.

Taxonomy
The species was first formally described by the botanist Leslie Pedley in 1978 as a part of the work A revision of Acacia Mill. in Queensland, Part 1 as published in the journal Austrobaileya. Pedley later reclassified it as Racosperma legnotum in 1987 but it was returned to genus Acacia in 2001.

Distribution
It is found in far north and north eastern Queensland on the Cape York Peninsula and is reasonably common from around Cape Flattery to Cooktown along the coast with populations found as far west as the Iron Range area and down to around Cowley Beach in the south where it is often situated on dunes or in shrubby heathland communities usually often surrounding streams or lagoons growing in sandy soils.

See also
List of Acacia species

References

legnota
Flora of Queensland
Taxa named by Leslie Pedley
Plants described in 1978